The Novohrad – Nógrád Geopark (NNG), a geopark straddling the border between Hungary and Slovakia, is one of the first transnational geoparks in the world. It is a member of the UNESCO Global Geoparks Network and European Geoparks Network.

Territory 
NNG is located in the Pannonian basin, situated in Central Europe. It is landlocked and dominated by hills, divided by valleys and basins.

Inhabitants 
Approximately 150 thousand people live within the geopark, which comprises the administrative area of 63 settlements in Hungary (including urban county Salgótarján) and 28 settlements in Slovakia. This area is also recognized as an important center for the Palóc ethnic group's folk art and living traditions. The rich cultural heritage of the area has been recognized by UNESCO as a World Cultural Heritage site with Hollókő located within the confinement of the geopark. The Southern part of the geopark can be reached by car in an hour from the Hungarian capital Budapest. Lučenec is the biggest Slovak city close to the Geopark. Being a transnational geopark, the name comes from the Slovak and Hungarian names of the county, where the geopark is located.

Geology 
The geological heritage of the Novohrad – Nógrád Geopark has a special significance. The area's stratigraphy represents deposition over the last 30 million years commencing with the initial opening of the Pannonian basin. The geology of the region is the product of a series dynamic of Earth processes. These processes include the collision of accreted terranes resulted in highly complex volcanism spanning 20 million years, the destruction and reactivation of marine basins, burial and the conservation of palaeohabitats.

The outstanding geological heritage of the region is a treasure to both the inhabitants and visitors. Its value was recognized even by earth scientists who started to reveal its secrets three centuries ago, when geological research first began in the area.

History 
Establishing the Novohrad – Nógrád Geopark is a grassroots movement, inspired by enthusiastic locals, has been building on the rich geological, natural and cultural heritage of the area.

 1998 - The idea of linking geosites on both sides of the border as a common geotourism project was born. The Bükk National Park Directorate (Hungary) and the Cerova Vrchovina CHKO (Slovakia) were the lead partners of it. 
 2005 - The main geopark project started in 2005 to the initiative of the Slovak side and the database of the area was accomplished on both sides by the end of 2007. 
 2008 - The headquarters of the Slovakian part was established in Filakovo.
 January 2009 - NNG applied for the European Geoparks Network membership.
 2010 -  NNG received the title from the European Geoparks Network. 
 2010 - NNG became a member of the Global Geoparks Network as one of the world's first cross-border geoparks.

Major Geosites
 Ipolytarnóc Fossils site
 Salgó Castle
 The Castle Hill of Filakovo
 The Castle Hill of Hajnacka
 The Castle Hill of Sámsonháza
 Dacite tuff of Tar
 Pohanský hrad
 Sandstones of Lipovany
 Somoska
 Dike of Hollókő
 Kazár
 Medves – Duniva Hora
 Guda
 The Cave of Mucin

References

External links 
 Official website of Novohrad-Nógrád Geopark
 Section on Ipolytarnóc Fossils Nature Conservation Area Website

Global Geoparks Network members
Geoparks in Hungary
Geoparks in Slovakia
Transboundary protected areas
Protected areas established in 2010